This is a list of Australian Statutory Instruments from 1907.

List of Australian Numbered Acts, 1907 
 Constitution Alteration (senate Elections) 1906 (no. 1, 1907)
 The Supply Act (no 1) 1907-8 (no. 2, 1907)
 The Supply Act (no 2) 1907-8 (no. 3, 1907)
 The Kalgoorlie To Port Augusta Railway Survey Act 1907 (no. 4, 1907)
 The Parliamentary Allowances Act 1907 (no. 5, 1907)
 The Appropriation (works And Buildings) Act 1907-8 (no. 6, 1907)
 The Commonwealth Salaries Act 1907 (no. 7, 1907)
 The Judiciary Act 1907 (no. 8, 1907)
 The Supply Act (no 3) 1907-8 (no. 9, 1907)
 The Disputed Elections And Qualifications Act 1907 (no. 10, 1907)
 The Supply Act (no 4) 1907-8 (no. 11, 1907)
 The Bounties Act 1907 (no. 12, 1907)

See also  
 List of Acts of the Parliament of Australia
 List of Statutory Instruments of Australia

External links 
 1907 Commonwealth of Australia Numbered Act http://www.austlii.edu.au/au/legis/cth/num_act/1907/
 COMLAW Historical Acts http://www.comlaw.gov.au/Browse/ByTitle/Acts/Historical
 COMLAW Select Statutory Instruments http://www.comlaw.gov.au/Browse/ByYearNumber/SelectLIsandStatRules/Asmade/0/

Lists of the Statutory Instruments of Australia
Statutory Instruments
1907 in law